Imperial Secretariat may refer to:

Imperial Secretariat Service, an administrative civil service of British India
Zhongshu Sheng, one of the 3 central government departments in imperial China from 620 to 1380

See also
Secretariat (disambiguation)
Central Secretariat (disambiguation)